Ken Frost (born 15 February  1967) is a Danish cyclist. He won the bronze medal in the Men's team pursuit in the 1992 Summer Olympics.

References 

Cyclists at the 1988 Summer Olympics
Cyclists at the 1992 Summer Olympics
Danish male cyclists
Olympic bronze medalists for Denmark
Olympic cyclists of Denmark
Olympic medalists in cycling
Medalists at the 1992 Summer Olympics
People from Rødovre
1967 births
Living people
Sportspeople from the Capital Region of Denmark